The Coachman Rat is an alternative account of the classic fairy tale Cinderella. It was published in 1989 and written by children's author David Henry Wilson.

Plot
The narrative follows the life of Robert, the rat that was transformed into the coachman on that fateful night when Amadea (Cinderella) fell in love with Prince Charming.  The majority of the novel is an account of the aftermath of that night, as Robert was transformed back into a rat at midnight of that night—yet retained the ability to speak; he then began a quest to find Mara, the "woman of light" (or Fairy Godmother) in order to become permanently human.

Critical reaction
Kirkus called it "clever" and "well-handled" but "obvious".  Pauline Morgan (for the Science Fiction Research Association Newsletter) found it "an allegory for the twentieth century" with the talking rat a curiosity and an outcast.  It was also reviewed by Library Journal, which found it a "highly recommended" but somber portrait of "Europe on the verge of the Enlightenment", and by Locus.

References

1989 British novels
Works based on Cinderella
Fictional mice and rats
Fiction about shapeshifting
Novels based on fairy tales
Parallel literature